Lukunor is an Island and municipality in the state of Chuuk, Federated States of Micronesia.

It is a small atoll part of the Nomoi Islands group, located about 264 km to the southeast of Chuuk.

History
Lukunor was first sighted by Europeans by the Spanish expedition of Álvaro de Saavedra shortly after August 1528 in its first attempt to return to New Spain.

Climate

References

Borthwick, Ernest Mark. Aging and Social Change on Lukunor Atoll, Micronesia. PhD dissertation, University of Iowa, 1977.

Municipalities of Chuuk State
Atolls of the Federated States of Micronesia